Sparsh Khanchandani is an Indian film and television child actress. She debuted with lead character of Young Ichcha in successful and long-running show Uttaran for which she received fame and critical acclaim for her performance in the series. She has been cast in a Hollywood film called Meena: Half The Sky, directed by actress Lucy Liu. Khanchandani won the Gr8! Young Achievers Award in 2010 presented by Indian Television Academy. She is a dubbing artist and is lending voice to Sofia The First as Princess Sofia since 2014 in the Hindi language. She has performed in the film Hichki as Oru.

Television

Movies

Dubbing Assignments

References

External links
 
 

Living people
Indian film actresses
Indian child actresses
2000 births